John Collie may refer to:

J. Norman Collie (1859–1942), British explorer and scientist
Sir John Collie (doctor) (1860–1935), British doctor, public servant, and politician
John Collie (musician) (born c. 1964), New Zealand musician (The DoubleHappys, Straitjacket Fits)